Sidespor is a Turkish sports club based in Side near Antalya, mainly concentrated on football. The club currently plays in the Amatör Futbol Ligleri.

Kits
The club plays in black and yellow kits.

Stadium
Currently the team plays at the 1050 capacity Side Atatürk Stadium.

League participations
TFF Second League: ?-2004
TFF Third League: 2004–2007

References

External links
AmatorFutbol 
TFF 

Football clubs in Turkey